The 1964 College Football All-America team is composed of college football players who were selected as All-Americans by various organizations that chose College Football All-America Teams in 1964. The six selectors recognized by the NCAA as "official" for the 1964 season are (1) the Associated Press (AP), (2) the United Press International (UPI), (3) the American Football Coaches Association (AFCA), (4) the Football Writers Association of America (FWAA), (5) the Central Press Association (CP), and (6) the Newspaper Enterprise Association (NEA).  Other selectors include Time magazine, Football News, and The Sporting News.

AP, UPI, NEA, and Central Press were all press organizations that polled writers and players.  FWAA was also a poll of writers, and the AFCA was a poll of college coaches.  The Sporting News and Time magazine polled football scouts and coaches.  AP, UPI, NEA, Central Press, and The Sporting News chose both first and second teams.  AP, UPI, NEA, and Central Press also listed numerous honorable mentions.

Consensus All-Americans
For the year 1964, the NCAA recognizes seven published All-American teams as "official" designations for purposes of its consensus determinations. The following chart identifies the NCAA-recognized consensus All-Americans and displays which first-team designations they received.

Offense

Ends and flankers
Fred Biletnikoff, Florida State (AFCA-2, AP-1, CP-1, FN [end], FWAA, NEA-1, WC)
Jack Snow, Notre Dame (AFCA, AP-2, CP-1, FN [end], FWAA, NEA-1, SN, UPI, Time, WC)
Karl Noonan, Iowa (AFCA-3, AP-2, NEA-1 [flanker], FN [end])
Bob Hadrick, Purdue (AFCA-2, CP-2)
Howard Twilley, Tulsa (AFCA-3, CP-2, NEA-3 [flanker])
David Ray, Alabama (FN [end])
Charles Casey, Florida (NEA-2)
Fred Hill, USC (NEA-2)
Len Frketich, Oregon State (NEA-3)
Jim Whalen, Boston College (NEA-3)

Offensive tackles
Larry Kramer, Nebraska (AP-1, UPI, NEA-1, CP-1, WC, AFCA-1, FWAA, FN)
Ralph Neely, Oklahoma (UPI, Time, WC, AFCA-1, SN, FN)
Jim Wilson, Georgia (AP-1, CP-2, NEA-1, FWAA)
Harry Schuh, Memphis State (AFCA-2, Time)
Jerry Rush, Michigan State (AP-2, NEA-3 [def. tackle])
 Dennis Murphy, Florida (FN)
Rich Koper, Oregon State (AP-2)
Butch Allison, Missouri (NEA-2)
Bill Zadel, Army (AFCA-2, NEA-3)
Carl Singer, Purdue (NEA-3)

Guards
Glenn Ressler, Penn State (AFCA-1, AP-2 [linebacker], CP-1, FN [center], FWAA, NEA-1 [center], SN, WC, Time [T])
Tommy Nobis, Texas  (AFCA-2, AP-1, FN, FWAA, NEA-1, UPI)
Stas Maliszewski, Princeton (FWAA)
Wayne Freeman, Alabama (AP-2, NEA-1)
Don Croftcheck, Indiana (NEA-2, SN)
Archie Sutton, Illinois (Time)
Bill Fisk, Jr., Southern California (AP-1)
Stan Hindman, Ole Miss (NEA-3, FN)
Jack Abendschan, New Mexico (AP-2)
John Niland, Iowa (NEA-2)

Centers
Dick Butkus, Illinois  (AFCA-1, AP-1 [linebacker], CP-1, FN, FWAA, NEA-2 [linebacker], SN, UPI, Time, WC)
Malcolm Walker, Rice (Time, SN)
Pat Killorin, Syracuse (AP-1)
Richard Granier, LSU (AP-2)
Joe Cerne, Northwestern (NEA-2)

Quarterbacks
John Huarte, Notre Dame  (AFCA-2, AP-1, CP-1, FN, UPI, WC)
Craig Morton, California  (AFCA-1, AP-2, FN, FWAA, NEA-1, SN, Time)
Bob Timberlake, Michigan (AP-1, FWAA, FN [halfback], NEA-2 [running back])
Jerry Rhome, Tulsa  (AFCA-3, AP-2, CP-2, FN, FWAA, NEA-3, UPI)
Bob Berry, Oregon (AFCA-1, AP-2, NEA-2)
Bob Schweickert, Virginia Tech (AP-2, FWAA)
Roger Staubach, Navy (FN [halfback])

Running backs
 Larry Elkins, Baylor (AFCA-1 [end], AP-1 [end], FN [end], FWAA, NEA-2 [flanker], SN, UPI, Time, WC)
 Gale Sayers, Kansas (AFCA-1, AP-1, CP-2, FN [halfback], FWAA, NEA-1, SN, UPI, WC, Time)
 Donny Anderson, Texas Tech (AFCA-3, AP-1, NEA-1, FWAA, Time, SN, FN [halfback])
 Floyd Little, Syracuse (FWAA, FN [halfback], NEA-3)
 Mike Garrett, USC (AFCA-3, CP-1)
 Jim Grabowski, Illinois (CP-2, UPI, FN [fullback])
 Tom Nowatzke, Indiana (AFCA-1 [fullback], AP-2 [defensive back])
 Larry Dupree, Florida (AFCA-1)
 Brian Piccolo, Wake Forest (AFCA-3, AP-2 [defensive back], FN [halfback], NEA-2)
 Jim Grisham, Oklahoma (FN [fullback])
 Cosmo Iacavazzi, Princeton (NEA-3, FN [fullback])
 Ken Willard, North Carolina (AFCA-2, CP-2)

Defense

Defensive ends
Allen Brown, Mississippi (AP-1, Time, SN)
Ray Rissmiller, Georgia (Time, SN)
Al Atkinson, Villanova (AFCA-3 [tackle], CP-2, NEA-1)
Alphonse Dotson, Grambling (NEA-1)
Harold Wells, Purdue (AP-1)
Jack Jacobson, Oklahoma State (AP-2)
Bill Cronin, Boston College (AP-2)
Vernon Biggs, Jackson State (NEA-2)
Aaron Brown, Minnesota (NEA-2)
Glenn Sasser, North Carolina St. (NEA-3)
Roy Jefferson, Utah (NEA-3, FN [end])

Defensive tackles
Bill Yearby, Michigan (AFCA-3, AP-2, CP-1, FN [tackle], NEA-1)
Jim Davidson, Ohio State (NEA-2 [off. tackle], SN, Time)
Dan Kearley, Alabama (AP-1)
John Van Sicklen, Iowa State (AP-1)
Remi Prudhomme, LSU (NEA-1, FN [end])
Ed Orazen, Ohio State (FN [tackle])
John Frick, Ohio Univ. (AP-2, NEA-3 [off. guard])
Jim Garcia, Purdue (NEA-2)
Kent Francisco, UCLA (NEA-2)
Kevin Hardy, Notre Dame (NEA-3)

Middle guards
Steve DeLong, Tennessee  (AP-1 [linebacker], NEA-1, FWAA, Time, FN [guard])
Ike Kelley, Ohio State (AFCA-2 [guard], FWAA, FN [center], NEA-2)
Malcolm Walker, Rice (NEA-3)

Linebackers
Rick Redman, Washington  (AFCA-1 [guard], CP-1, FN [guard], FWAA, NEA-3, UPI)
Ronnie Caveness, Arkansas (AFCA-3 [guard], AP-1, CP-2, NEA-1, FWAA, Time, SN, FN [guard])
Jim Carroll, Notre Dame (AFCA-3 [guard], CP-2, Time, SN, FN [guard])
Jack O'Billovich, Oregon State (NEA-1)
Carl McAdams, Oklahoma (AFCA-3 [center], AP-2, NEA-1)
Marty Schottenheimer, Pitt (AP-2, NEA-2)
Bill Curry, Georgia Tech (AFCA-2 [center], CP-2, NEA-2)
John Chapple, Stanford (NEA-3)
Mike Curtis, Duke (NEA-3)

Defensive backs
Tucker Frederickson, Auburn (AFCA-2 [fullback], AP-1, Time, NEA, CP-1, WC, FWAA, SN)
Clancy Williams, Washington State (AP-1, NEA, FWAA, Time, SN)
Arnie Chonko, Ohio State (AP-1, NEA-1)
Cosmo Iacavazzi, Princeton (AP-1, CP-1, FN)
Roy Jefferson, Utah (Time, SN, FN)
George Donnelly, Illinois (NEA-3, SN, Time)
Gerry Bussell, Georgia Tech (Time, SN)
Ken Hatfield, Arkansas (AP-2, NEA-3 [safety])
Bruce Bennett, Florida (AP-2)
Wayne Swinford, Georgia (NEA-2)
Tony Carey, Notre Dame (NEA-2)
Mickey Andrews, Alabama (NEA-2 [safety])
Rodger Bird, Kentucky (AFCA-2)
Kent McCloughan, Nebraska (NEA-3)

Key

Official selectors

Other selectors

See also
 1964 All-Atlantic Coast Conference football team
 1964 All-Big Eight Conference football team
 1964 All-Big Ten Conference football team
 1964 All-Pacific Coast football team
 1964 All-SEC football team
 1964 All-Southwest Conference football team

References

All-America Team
College Football All-America Teams